Jaime Elizondo is an American football and a Canadian football coach.  Elizondo has had 25 years of coaching experience in both collegiate and professional levels, most recently serving as the head coach, offensive coordinator, and quarterbacks coach of the Edmonton Elks of the Canadian Football League (CFL) during the 2021 CFL season. Elizondo previously served as the offensive coordinator for the Tampa Bay Vipers and the Ottawa Redblacks where he was a Grey Cup champion in 2016.

Elizondo was born in Aguascalientes, Mexico, and was raised in El Paso, Texas, and is a graduate of the University of Maryland and American University Washington College of Law, holding a Juris Doctor degree from the latter.

References

External links
 Edmonton Elks profile

Living people
Edmonton Elks coaches
Montreal Alouettes coaches
Ottawa Redblacks coaches
Sportspeople from Aguascalientes
Tampa Bay Vipers coaches
Toronto Argonauts coaches
Year of birth missing (living people)